Badminton Netherlands is the national governing body for the sport of badminton in the Netherlands. , there are around 35,000 registered players and 503 clubs across the country. The association was divided into seven regions, namely Noord (North), Noord-Holland (North Holland), Zuid-West (Southwest), Zentrum (Central), Oost (East), Noord-Brabant (North Brabant), and Limburg (Limburg).

History
Originally founded on 15 November 1931 as the Dutch Badminton Association (NBB) in Noordwijk by the pioneers of Dutch badminton including Dirk Stikker. It later became one of the founding members of International Badminton Federation and Badminton Europe. As a hope to gain more exposure, the association was rebranded with a new logo and renamed as Badminton Nederland starting from 30 January 2010.

Tournaments
 Dutch Open, part of BWF Tour Super 100.
 Dutch International
 Dutch Junior International
 Dutch National Badminton Championships

References

National members of the Badminton World Federation
Badminton in the Netherlands
Badminton
Organisations based in Utrecht (province)
Sport in Nieuwegein
1931 establishments in the Netherlands